Lu Lan (born 2 May 1987) is a badminton player from China.

Career
In 2004, she won the Polish Open. In 2006, she won the Korea Open and finished the year in the 5th position in the BWF World Ranking.

In 2007, she won the Denmark Super Series, and was a bronze medalist at the World Championships in Kuala Lumpur, losing to the eventual champion Zhu Lin in the semifinals.

In 2008 Beijing Olympic Games, she lost to Xie Xingfang 21–7, 10–21, 12–21 in the semi-finals and was then upset by Maria Kristin Yulianti from Indonesia 21–11, 13–21, 15–21 in the bronze medal match. Earlier in 2008 she had reached the final of the prestigious All-England Championships where she lost a very close match to Denmark's Tine Rasmussen.

In 2009, she achieved her greatest success to date when she won the 2009 BWF World Championship Women's Singles title in Hyderabad, India. The match was against compatriot, and two times winner of the event (2005 and 2006), Xie Xingfang; winning in two straight games 23–21, 21–12.

After retiring from the tournament in 2013, she continued her education at the Beijing Sport University. She married Peng Yu in September 2013, and lived in Shanghai. She then became an official umpire on the BWF World Tour, the first renowned player who successfully transitioned to an officiating job in the sport.

Achievements

BWF World Championships 
Women's singles

World Cup 
Women's singles

Asian Championships 
Women's singles

World Junior Championships 
Girls' singles

Asian Junior Championships 
Girls' singles

BWF Superseries 
The BWF Superseries, launched on 14 December 2006 and implemented in 2007, is a series of elite badminton tournaments, sanctioned by Badminton World Federation (BWF). BWF Superseries has two levels: Superseries and Superseries Premier. A season of Superseries features twelve tournaments around the world, which introduced since 2011, with successful players invited to the Superseries Finals held at the year end.

Women's singles

 BWF Superseries Finals tournament
 BWF Superseries Premier tournament
 BWF Superseries tournament

BWF Grand Prix 
The BWF Grand Prix has two levels, the Grand Prix and Grand Prix Gold. It is a series of badminton tournaments sanctioned by the Badminton World Federation (BWF) since 2007. The World Badminton Grand Prix has been sanctioned by the International Badminton Federation since 1983.

Women's singles

 BWF Grand Prix Gold tournament
 BWF & IBF Grand Prix tournament

IBF International 
Women's singles

Record against selected opponents 
Record against year-end Finals finalists, World Championships semi-finalists, and Olympic quarter-finalists.

References

External links
 BWF profile
 

1987 births
Living people
Sportspeople from Changzhou
Badminton players from Jiangsu
Chinese female badminton players
Badminton players at the 2008 Summer Olympics
Olympic badminton players of China
Badminton players at the 2010 Asian Games
Asian Games gold medalists for China
Asian Games medalists in badminton
Medalists at the 2010 Asian Games
World No. 1 badminton players